Pravin Krishna (born 1969) is Chung Ju Yung Distinguished Professor of International Economics and Business  at the School of Advanced International Studies (SAIS) and the Department of Economics in the Zanvyl Krieger School of Arts and Sciences at Johns Hopkins University. Krishna holds a Ph.D. in Economics from Columbia University and a B. Tech in Engineering from the Indian Institute of Technology, Bombay. He is a research associate at the National Bureau of Economic Research and serves on the editorial board of the Journal of International Economics. Krishna was previously Professor of Economics at Brown University and has held academic appointments at Princeton University, Stanford University and the University of Chicago.

Bibliography
 Trade Blocs: Economics and Politics, Cambridge University Press (2005)
 Trade Blocs: Alternate Analyses of Preferential Trade Agreements, Co-Editor with Jagdish Bhagwati and Arvind Panagariya, MIT Press (1999)

External links
VOX Article

References

Living people
1969 births
IIT Bombay alumni
Brown University faculty